Haliç is a station on the M2 line of the Istanbul Metro. It is a part of the Golden Horn Metro Bridge and is located between the districts of Fatih and Beyoğlu above the Golden Horn. The station was opened on 15 February 2014 as part of the line's extension to Yenikapı Transfer Center. The station is accessible from both sides of the Golden Horn via pedestrian walkways adjacent to the bridge. Haliç has two side platforms, one for each direction. İETT bus service can be accessed on both sides of the bridge from Tersane Street on the Beyoğlu side and Abdülezelpaşa Street on the Fatih side. Haliç is the only station on aboveground at the line.

Layout

Gallery

References

Railway stations opened in 2014
Golden Horn
2014 establishments in Turkey
Istanbul metro stations